Cecilia Errin (born 13 December 1998) is a Congolese handball player for Handball Octeville-sur-Mer and the DR Congo national team.

She represented DR Congo at the 2019 World Women's Handball Championship.

References

1998 births
Living people
Democratic Republic of the Congo female handball players
People from Pointe-à-Pitre
21st-century Democratic Republic of the Congo people